Earthquakes are relatively frequent occurrences in Guatemala.  The country lies in a major fault zone known as the Motagua and Chixoy-Polochic fault complex, which cuts across Guatemala and forms the tectonic boundary between the Caribbean Plate and the North American Plate. In addition, along Guatemala's western coast line, the Cocos plate pushes against the Caribbean Plate, forming a subduction zone known as the Middle America Trench located approximately 50 km off Guatemala's Pacific coast. This subduction zone led to the formation of the Central America Volcanic Arc, and is an important source of offshore earthquakes.  Both these major tectonic processes have generated deformations within the Caribbean plate and produced secondary fault zones, like the Mixco, Jalpatagua, and Santa Catarina Pinula faults.

The most destructive earthquake in recent Guatemalan history was the 1976 quake with a magnitude of 7.5 Mw and a hypocenter depth of just 5 km. This shallow-focus earthquake, originating from the Motagua Fault,  caused 23,000 fatalities, leaving 76,000 injured and causing widespread material damage. Surprisingly, the 7.9 Mw earthquake of 1942, though higher in magnitude, was much less destructive, in part because of its substantially deeper hypocenter depth of 60 km.

A number of earthquakes with low magnitudes caused major damage in very localized areas, which may in part be explained by their relatively shallow depth. This was the case with the 1985 Uspantán earthquake of 5.0 Mw with a depth of 5 km, which destroyed most buildings in the town of Uspantán, but caused little or no damage in the rest of the country.

Earthquakes
Guatemala is in constant earthquake activity. However, there are some earthquakes that are more notable due to the damage they've caused. Notable earthquakes in recent Guatemalan history include the following:

MM = Intensity on the Modified Mercalli intensity scale

See also 

 Chixoy-Polochic Fault
 Geography of Guatemala
 Motagua Fault

References

Sources

 
 
 
 
 
 
 

 Seismic data of Guatemala, Retrieved on July 28, 2008
 details on Historic Earthquakes in Guatemala. Retrieved on July 28, 2008.

External links
Instituto Nacional de Sismología, Vulcanología, Meteorología e Hidrolagía (INSIVUMEH)
Guatemala - Earthquake information by Earthquake Engineering Research Institute

 
Guatemala
Lists of events in Guatemala